In quantum information, the gnu code refers to a particular family of quantum error correcting codes, with the special property of being invariant under permutations of the qubits. Given integers g (the gap), n (the occupancy), and m (the length of the code), the two codewords are

where  are the Dicke states consisting of a uniform superposition of all weight-k words on m qubits, e.g.

The real parameter  scales the density of the code. The length , hence the name of the code.

References

Quantum information science
Fault-tolerant computer systems